The 13th Central American and Caribbean Junior Championships were held in
the Truman Bodden Sports Complex in  Georgetown, Cayman Islands between 10–12 July 1998.

Records

A total of 19 new championship records were set.

Key

†: Electronic timing.  Still better hand timing results.

Medal summary

Complete results are published on the CFPI and on the World Junior Athletics History website, and medal winners are published by category: Junior A, Male, Junior A, Female, and Junior B.

Male Junior A (under 20)
 

†: Event marked as exhibition.

Female Junior A (under 20)

†: Event marked as exhibition.

Male Junior B (under 17)

†: Event marked as exhibition.

Female Junior B (under 17)

Medal table (unofficial)

Participation (unofficial)

The Commonwealth of Dominica competed for the first time at the championships. Detailed result lists can be found on the CFPI and on the World Junior Athletics History website.   An unofficial count yields the number of about 361 athletes (187 junior (under-20) and 174 youth (under-17)) from about 21 countries:

 (2)
 (5)
 (1)
 (21)
 (23)
 (7)
 (4)
 (30)
 (1)
 (7)
 (4)
 (14)
 (2)
 (76)
 México (74)
 (2)
 (47)
 (2)
 (3)
 (28)
 (8)

References

External links
Official CACAC Website
Local Championships Website
World Junior Athletics History

Central American and Caribbean Junior Championships in Athletics
International sports competitions hosted by the Cayman Islands
1998 in the Cayman Islands
Central American and Caribbean Junior Championships
George Town, Cayman Islands
Athletics competitions in the Cayman Islands
1998 in youth sport